This page lists Districts of Himachal Pradesh by their District gross domestic product (GDP).

List of Districts
This is a list of districts of Himachal Pradesh by their Gross District Domestic Product (GDDP) for the year 2005-06.

References

Districts by GDP
Economy of Himachal Pradesh